Amber Scott is an Australian ballet dancer. She is a principal artist at The Australian Ballet.

Early life
Scott was born and raised in Brisbane, Australia. She started dance classes at age three and ballet at age five. She also attended jazz and tap classes. When Scott was eleven, her family relocated to Melbourne, and she started training at The Australian Ballet School.

Career
Scott joined The Australian Ballet in 2001, at age 17. In 2003, she spent five months at the Royal Danish Ballet and learned the Bournonville method there. In 2011, Scott was promoted to Principal Artist after dancing the second movement in Kenneth MacMillan's Concerto. She has danced classical roles such as Princess Aurora and the Lilac Fairy in The Sleeping Beauty, Odette/Odile in Swan Lake, Sugar Plum Fairy in The Nutcracker, the title role in Manon and Tatiana in Onegin, as well as contemporary pieces such as Chroma and After the Rain. In 2016, Scott partnered with David Hallberg in Coppélia, which was his first performance after he had recovered from a career-threatening injury.

Personal life
Scott is married to fellow Australian Ballet dancer Ty King-Wall. They have two daughters.

Selected repertoire

Swanilda in Coppélia
Aurora and the Lilac Fairy in The Sleeping Beauty
Giselle in Giselle
Nikiya in La Bayadère
The Sugar Plum Fairy in The Nutcracker
Odette/Odile in Swan Lake
Odette in Graeme Murphy's Swan Lake

Manon in Manon
Tatiana in Onegin
Hanna in The Merry Widow
Second movement in Concerto
Chroma
After the Rain

Awards
Helpmann Award nomination for Stephen Baynes’ Swan Lake, 2013
Telstra Ballet Dancer Award and Telstra People's Choice Award, 2004
First Place Junior Asian Pacific Competition, Tokyo, 1999
Adeline Genée Awards, bronze medal, 1998

References 

Australian ballerinas
Australian Ballet principal dancers
Living people
1980s births
21st-century ballet dancers
People from Brisbane
Australian Ballet School alumni
Prima ballerinas
Telstra Ballet Dancer Award winners
Telstra People's Choice Award winners
21st-century Australian dancers